Don Juan DeMercado (Traditional Chinese: 情人眼裏高一D) is a TVB Mini-New Years series. Episode 1 and 6 are 45 minutes long. The rest of the episodes are 22 minutes long.

Synopsis
The story is about a plain-looking vegetable market worker Gung Yan-tung (Wong Cho-lam) who mysteriously turn into the most popular cantopop star Gan Lik-shun (Bosco Wong) after he eats chocolate.

While Gun Lik-shun is in "singer mode", he is by far the best selling celebrity in Hong Kong. The problem is that when the chocolate effect wears off, Gung Yan-tung becomes a regular person again. He soon develops a relationship with Tse On-fei (Kate Tsui), who has no idea of his real identity.

Production note
The character played by Bosco Wong, Gan Lik-Shun is a spoof of Eason Chan's Chinese name "Chan Yik-seon" (陳奕迅), while Wong Cho Lam's role, Lik-Shun's original form's name, Gung Yan Tung, is a spoof of Gillian Chung's Chinese name "Zhong Yan-Tung" (鍾欣桐).  The character played by Kate Tsui, Tse On-fei is a spoof of Kay Tse's Chinese name Tse On-kei (謝安琪).

Cast

Viewership ratings

See also
 From act to act (娛樂插班生)

References

External links
TVB.com Don Juan De Mercado - Official Website 

TVB dramas
2010 Hong Kong television series debuts
2010 Hong Kong television series endings